Isqat is a village in Syria, administratively part of Idlib Governorate. Nearby localities include Salqin to the southwest, Kafr Takharim to the southeast, Harem to the northeast and al-Alani to the west. According to the Syria Central Bureau of Statistics (CBS), Isqat had a population of 4,535 in 2004.

References

Populated places in Harem District